Raila is a part of Kibera slum in Nairobi. Other parts of Kibera include Laini Saba, Lindi, Makina, Kianda, Gatwekera, Soweto East, Kichinjio, Kisumu Ndogo, Makongeni and Mashimoni.

See also
Sarang'ombe
Shilanga
Siranga

References

Suburbs of Nairobi
Slums in Kenya